Ramjagan  is an Indian television, drama and movie actor.

Filmography

 Maharshi (1988)
Siva (1989)
 Patha Basti (1995)
 Ooru ki monagadu (1995)
Deyyam (1996)
Preyasi Rave (1999)
 Annayya (2000)
Shock (2006)
 Bhagyalakshmi Bumper Draw' (2006)Nagaram (2008)Mahatma (2009)
 Masala (2013)Next Nuvve (2017)

Television

Kalyana vaibogam

Awards
2009 : Nandi Award for Best Supporting Actor - Mahatma''

References

External links

A Chitchat With Comedian and supporting Actor Ramjagan
An Interview with Ramjagan - Part 1

Indian male television actors
Living people
Telugu male actors
Male actors from Telangana
Nandi Award winners
Indian male comedians
Telugu comedians
Year of birth missing (living people)